Carlo Montano (born 25 September 1952) is an Italian fencer. He won a silver medal in the team foil event at the 1976 Summer Olympics.

References

1952 births
Living people
Italian male fencers
Olympic fencers of Italy
Fencers at the 1972 Summer Olympics
Fencers at the 1976 Summer Olympics
Sportspeople from Livorno
Olympic silver medalists for Italy
Olympic medalists in fencing
Medalists at the 1976 Summer Olympics
20th-century Italian people